The Naked Heart (French title: Maria Chapdelaine) is a 1950 British-French historical drama film directed by Marc Allégret, based on the novel Maria Chapdelaine by Louis Hémon. The film stars Michèle Morgan, Kieron Moore and Françoise Rosay. It was released in separate English and French versions. A previous film version had been made in 1934.

It tells the story of a  convent girl in a remote Northern Canadian village at the beginning of the 20th century.

Cast
 Michèle Morgan as Maria Chapdelaine  
 Kieron Moore as Lorenzo Surprenant  
 Françoise Rosay as Laura Chapdelaine  
 Jack Watling as Robert Gagnon 
 Philippe Lemaire as François Paradis  
 Nancy Price as Theresa Suprenant  
 Francis de Wolff as Papa Suprenant  
 George Woodbridge as Samuel Chapdelaine
 Brian Roper as Tit-Be Chapdelaine

References

External links

1950 films
1950s English-language films
English-language French films
1950s French-language films
British historical drama films
1950s historical drama films
Films directed by Marc Allégret
French black-and-white films
Films based on French novels
Films based on Canadian novels
Films set in Quebec
1950 drama films
British black-and-white films
1950s British films
1950s French films